Slovenia competed at the 1996 Summer Olympics in Atlanta, United States.

Medalists

Archery

In Slovenia's second archery competition, the nation entered only men.  Veteran Samo Medved won his first two matches before being defeated in the round of 16.
Men

Athletics

Men
Track & road events

Field events

Women
Track & road events

Field events

Canoeing

Slalom

Cycling

One male cyclist represented Slovenia in 1996.

Road

Rowing

Men

Sailing

Men

Women

Shooting

Men

Swimming

Men

Women

References
sports-reference
Official Olympic Reports
International Olympic Committee results database

Nations at the 1996 Summer Olympics
Olympics
1996 Summer Olympics